Madhu Kaithapram was an Indian film director who worked primarily in the Malayalam film industry based in Kerala. He made his directorial debut with the feature film Ekantham in 2006 that won him the National Film Award for the best debutant director and followed it up with the critically acclaimed Madhya Venal (2009) and the family-drama Orma Mathram (2011). His last venture Velli Velichathil was  released on 19 September 2014. He died on 29 December 2014. He was under treatment for diabetes.

Filmography

References

External links
 

1970 births
2014 deaths
Malayalam film directors
Artists from Kannur
Film directors from Kerala
21st-century Indian film directors
Director whose film won the Best Debut Feature Film National Film Award